In geometry, a disdyakis triacontahedron, hexakis icosahedron, decakis dodecahedron or kisrhombic triacontahedron is a Catalan solid with 120 faces and the dual to the Archimedean truncated icosidodecahedron. As such it is face-uniform but with irregular face polygons. It slightly resembles an inflated rhombic triacontahedron: if one replaces each face of the rhombic triacontahedron with a single vertex and four triangles in a regular fashion, one ends up with a disdyakis triacontahedron. That is, the disdyakis triacontahedron is the Kleetope of the rhombic triacontahedron. It is also the barycentric subdivision of the regular dodecahedron and icosahedron. It has the most faces among the Archimedean and Catalan solids, with the snub dodecahedron, with 92 faces, in second place. 

If the bipyramids, the gyroelongated bipyramids, and the trapezohedra are excluded, the disdyakis triacontahedron has the most faces of any other strictly convex polyhedron where every face of the polyhedron has the same shape.

Projected into a sphere, the edges of a disdyakis triacontahedron define 15 great circles. Buckminster Fuller used these 15 great circles, along with 10 and 6 others in two other polyhedra to define his 31 great circles of the spherical icosahedron.

Cartesian coordinates
The 62 vertices of the disdyakis triacontahedron fall in three sets:

 Twelve vertices are of the form  and its cyclic permutations, and they form a regular icosahedron among themselves.
If those 30 face centers are scaled outwards from the origin by a factor, yielding  and  then they and their cyclic permutations form the last 30 vertices of the disdyakis triacontahedron.

These hulls are visualized in the figure below scaled so the icosahedron has a unit circumradius:

Faces

The faces of a disdyakis triacontahedron are scalene triangles.

Symmetry
The edges of the polyhedron projected onto a sphere form 15 great circles, and represent all 15 mirror planes of reflective Ih icosahedral symmetry. Combining pairs of light and dark triangles define the fundamental domains of the nonreflective (I) icosahedral symmetry. The edges of a compound of five octahedra also represent the 10 mirror planes of icosahedral symmetry.

Orthogonal projections
The disdyakis triacontahedron has three types of vertices which can be centered in orthogonally projection:

Uses

The disdyakis triacontahedron, as a regular dodecahedron with pentagons divided into 10 triangles each, is considered the "holy grail" for combination puzzles like the Rubik's cube. This unsolved problem, often called the "big chop" problem, currently has no satisfactory mechanism. It is the most significant unsolved problem in mechanical puzzles.This shape was used to make d120 dice using 3D printing. Since 2016, the Dice Lab has used the disdyakis triacontahedron to mass market an injection moulded 120 sided  die. It is claimed that the d120 is the largest number of possible faces on a fair die, aside from infinite families (such as right regular prisms, bipyramids, and trapezohedra) that would be impractical in reality due to the tendency to roll for a long time.

A disdyakis tricontahedron projected onto a sphere is used as the logo for Brilliant, a website containing series of lessons on STEM-related topics.

Related polyhedra and tilings 

It is topologically related to a polyhedra sequence defined by the face configuration V4.6.2n. This group is special for having all even number of edges per vertex and form bisecting planes through the polyhedra and infinite lines in the plane, and continuing into the hyperbolic plane for any n ≥ 7.

With an even number of faces at every vertex, these polyhedra and tilings can be shown by alternating two colors so all adjacent faces have different colors.

Each face on these domains also corresponds to the fundamental domain of a symmetry group with order 2,3,n mirrors at each triangle face vertex. This is *n32 in orbifold notation, and [n,3] in Coxeter notation.

References

 (Section 3-9)
 (The thirteen semiregular convex polyhedra and their duals, Page 25, Disdyakistriacontahedron)
The Symmetries of Things 2008, John H. Conway, Heidi Burgiel, Chaim Goodman-Strauss,   (Chapter 21, Naming the Archimedean and Catalan polyhedra and tilings, page 285, kisRhombic triacontahedron)

External links

Disdyakis triacontahedron (Hexakis Icosahedron) – Interactive Polyhedron Model

Catalan solids